Mary Renetta Hawton (née Bevis; 4 September 1924 – 18 January 1981) was a tennis player from Australia. Her career ranged from the 1940s to the 1950s.

Hawton won the women's doubles title at the Australian Championships five times. In 1958 she also won the mixed doubles title together with compatriot Robert Howe.

In 1948, she married Keith Ernest Hawton.

She was captain of the Australian Fed Cup team in 1979 and 1980 and director of the NSW Tennis Association.

In 1979, Hawton published a book titled How to Play Winning Tennis. She died on 18 January 1981 in Sydney, Australia.

The Mary Hawton Trophy, the prize for the winner of the Australian teams championships for girls, was named after her, as is Hawton Place, in the Canberra suburb of Chisholm.

Career
Mary Hawton found much success in Australia at the Australian Championships. She made it to the semifinals in singles six times in 1948, 1952, 1953, 1954, 1956 and 1959. Hawton reached 12 finals in Australia, eight of these being consecutive. She also reached the doubles finals at the Wimbledon and French Championships in 1957 and 1958 with Australian Thelma Coyne Long. Hawton ended her career with six Grand Slam titles: five in women's doubles and one in mixed doubles.

Grand Slam finals

Doubles: 14 (5–9)

Mixed doubles: 2 (1–1)

Grand Slam performance timelines

Singles

Doubles

References

External links
 

1924 births
1981 deaths
Australian Championships (tennis) champions
Australian female tennis players
French Championships (tennis) champions
Tennis players from Sydney
Wimbledon champions (pre-Open Era)
Grand Slam (tennis) champions in mixed doubles
Grand Slam (tennis) champions in women's doubles
Sportswomen from New South Wales